"Sunshine" is a song by New Zealand–Australian rock band Dragon, released in July 1977 as the third and final single to be released from the band's third studio album Sunshine (1976). It peaked at number 36 on the Kent Music Report and remained in the chart for 15 weeks.

Track listing 
 Sunshine (Paul Hewson) – 4:26
 New Machine (P. Hewson) – 3:47

Charts

Certifications

Personnel 
 Paul Hewson – keyboards
 Marc Hunter — lead vocals
 Todd Hunter — bass guitar
 Kerry Jacobson – drums 
 Robert M. Taylor – Guitars (electric, acoustic)

Production
 Producer – Peter Dawkins

References

External links
Dragon – Sunshine (Vinyl)

Dragon (band) songs
1977 singles
1977 songs
CBS Records singles
Portrait Records singles
Song recordings produced by Peter Dawkins (musician)